"A Rose and a Baby Ruth" is a song written by John D. Loudermilk under his "Johnny Dee" pseudonym. The song was published in 1956. The best-known version was recorded by George Hamilton IV. The song reached number 6 on the Billboard magazine pop chart and spent 20 weeks on the chart.

"A Rose and a Baby Ruth" showed regional appeal in country music, foreshadowing Hamilton's highly successful career, in the 1960s.

Chart performance

Covers 
At the same date as Billboard reviewed George Hamilton IV´s original version - in October 1956 - they reviewed a competing cover sung by Eddie Fontaine and released by Decca. Billboard predicted it would be a close race between the two recordings, but the Decca release did not make even the lower part of Billboard´s Top 100.

Johnny Maestro & The Crests did a version in 1960 for their first album, "The Crests Sing All Biggies" - (Coed LP 901).

Al Kooper covered it on his 1970 Columbia release "Easy Does It".

The song was covered by Marilyn Manson as a bonus studio track on the limited edition version of The Last Tour On Earth live album in 1999.

Singles

By George Hamilton IV 
(1956) A Rose and a Baby Ruth/If You Don't Know-ABC Paramount Records
(1956) A Rose and a Baby Ruth/If You Don't Know-Colonial Records   With the Country Gentlemen, Featuring Joe Tanner on guitar

References

External links
 

Songs written by John D. Loudermilk
1956 songs
1956 singles
Colonial Records
John D. Loudermilk songs
George Hamilton IV songs